Federal Highway 196 (Carretera Federal 196) is a Federal Highway of Mexico. The highway is a spur route that connects Chichihualco, Guerrero and Mexican Federal Highway 95 in the southeast.

References

196